The Białystok School of Public Administration was a non-state higher education institution founded in 1996 as an initiative of the Foundation in Support of Local Democracy. It was a non-state and non-profit school of higher education.

The school's rector was Barbara Kudrycka. The school was closed in 2019.

Location

Courses of study
Public administration
Cultural Studies
International Relations
Philosophy
Public Health Management
Spatial Economy
Pedagogy
Homeland security

References

External links

Defunct universities and colleges in Białystok
Educational institutions established in 1996
1996 establishments in Poland
Educational institutions disestablished in 2019